Lilly Paulin Stoffelsma (born 12 August 2002) is a German field hockey player.

Career

Club level
In club competition, Stoffelsma plays for Düsseldorfer in the German Bundesliga.

National teams

Under–18
Lilly Stoffelsma made her international debut for Germany at U–18 level. She first represented the team in 2018 during a test series against France in Paris. Later that year, she appeared at the 2018 edition of the EuroHockey Youth Championship in Santander.

She went on to represent the youth side a number of times, most notably winning gold at the 2021 EuroHockey Youth Championship in Valencia.

Under–21
In 2022, Stoffelsma was named in the German U–21 squad for the FIH Junior World Cup in Potchefstroom.

Die Danas
Stoffelsma made her senior debut for Die Danas in 2022. Her first appearance was during season three of the FIH Pro League, in Germany's away matches against Belgium. She later went on to compete in the away matches against India, and was a penalty taker for Germany in the deciding shoot-outs.

References

External links
 
 

2002 births
Living people
German female field hockey players
Female field hockey midfielders